Glen(n) Davies may refer to:

Glen Davies (footballer) (born 1976), English footballer
Glen Davies (politician) (1943–2003), Australian politician
Glenn Davies (born 1950), Australian Anglican bishop
Glen Davies (Welsh footballer) on List of Swansea City A.F.C. players
Glen Davies (actor) (born 1960) in Bear Behaving Badly

See also
Glyn Davies (disambiguation)
Glen Davis (disambiguation)
Glenn Davis (disambiguation)